Muhammad Soufi bin Rusli is an international Malaysian lawn bowler.

Bowls career

Commonwealth Games
Rusli represented Malaysia in the singles and triples at the 2018 Commonwealth Games; he reached the quarter finals of the singles. In 2022, he competed in the men's triples and the men's fours at the 2022 Commonwealth Games.

World Cup Singles
He won the silver medal at the 2017 World Cup Singles losing to Jeremy Henry in the final.

Asia Pacific
Rusli has won four medals at the Asia Pacific Bowls Championships; the latest medals being a double bronze medal at the 2019 Asia Pacific Bowls Championships in the Gold Coast, Queensland.

Southeast Asian Games
He also won a gold medal at the Lawn bowls at the 2017 Southeast Asian Games in the singles.

References

Malaysian male bowls players
Living people
1987 births
Southeast Asian Games gold medalists for Malaysia
Southeast Asian Games bronze medalists for Malaysia
Competitors at the 2017 Southeast Asian Games
Competitors at the 2019 Southeast Asian Games
Bowls players at the 2018 Commonwealth Games
Bowls players at the 2022 Commonwealth Games
Commonwealth Games competitors for Malaysia
20th-century Malaysian people
21st-century Malaysian people